Fred Luther Foster (July 26, 1931 – February 20, 2019) was an American record producer, songwriter, and music business executive who founded Monument Records. As a record producer he was most closely associated with Roy Orbison, and was also involved in the early careers of Dolly Parton and Willie Nelson. Foster suggested to Kris Kristofferson the title and theme of "Me and Bobby McGee", which became a hit for Kristofferson, Roger Miller, and Janis Joplin, and for which Foster received a co-writing credit.

Biography

Early life and career
Born in Rutherford County, North Carolina, Foster struggled to support his mother after the death of his father. At the age of seventeen, Foster left the farm and moved to Washington, D.C. He started writing songs and initially worked in a record store and then for J&F Distributors. He soon began recording local acts, and supervised Jimmy Dean's debut hit, "Bumming Around".

In 1953 he started to work for Mercury Records, but clashed with the company's executives over his endorsement of rockabilly acts.  In late 1955, he unsuccessfully tried to convince Fred Talmadge, Mercury's Marketing Director, to sign the 20 year old Elvis Presley, then still at Sun Records but with  competing  offers from both Atlantic and RCA Records. Mercury, like  Atlantic, offered US$30,000, both being outbid by RCA who signed Presley for US$40,000. As Presley sold 10 million record units in the next 12 months, RCA recouped the investment in less than 24 hours. Foster then briefly joined ABC-Paramount, where he acquired the rights to George Hamilton IV's recording, "A Rose and a Baby Ruth", which became the company's first million-seller, and also signed Lloyd Price to the label.

Monument Records
In March 1958, while working in Baltimore,  Foster used his life savings and formed Monument Records and publishing company Combine Music with minority partner Buddy Deane, a disc jockey at WTTG. In 1959, after the company had seen some success with records by Billy Grammer and others, Deane sold his stock back to Foster, and Foster re-located the label to Hendersonville, Tennessee, in 1960. Foster remained active with the label until the 1980s.

Foster is credited with the development of Roy Orbison's career, producing Orbison's early hits, including "Only the Lonely" – his breakthrough hit – "Oh, Pretty Woman", "Running Scared", "In Dreams", "Crying", "It's Over", "Mean Woman Blues", "Pretty Paper", and "Blue Bayou". Writer Richie Unterberger has compared Foster to more widely known producers such as Phil Spector and Leiber and Stoller, for the way in which he expanded the range of instrumentation used on pop and rock'n'roll records, using orchestration and choirs of vocalists, as well as making extensive use of Nashville session musicians such as Charlie McCoy and Jerry Kennedy.

In 1963, Foster expanded his label, forming the soul and R&B imprint Sound Stage 7. Its roster of artists included Joe Simon, the Dixie Belles, Arthur Alexander, and Ivory Joe Hunter. Orbison left the Monument label in 1964. Thereafter, Foster worked mainly with country musicians. He played a significant role in Dolly Parton's early career, signing her to Monument in 1964, shortly after her arrival in Nashville, and overseeing her recordings, culminating with her first top-40 country hit, "Dumb Blonde", in 1967. Foster also produced recordings by Willie Nelson, Ray Stevens, Kris Kristofferson, Tony Joe White, Larry Gatlin, Charlie McCoy, Al Hirt, Boots Randolph, Jeannie Seely, Jerry Byrd, Billy Joe Shaver, Grandpa Jones, the Velvets, and Robert Mitchum. Foster suggested to Kris Kristofferson the title and theme of "Me and Bobby McGee", which became a hit for Kristofferson, Roger Miller, and Janis Joplin, and for which Foster received a co-writing credit.

Later activities
Foster sold the Monument label to Sony in the early 1980s. However, he remained active with his own Sunstone production company.  He produced Willie Nelson's 2006 Grammy Award–nominated You Don't Know Me: The Songs of Cindy Walker and Nelson's collaboration with Merle Haggard and Ray Price, Last of the Breed (2007). The latter was the winner of the 2008 Grammy for Best Country Collaboration, for the track "Lost Highway". Foster’s final production was Dawn Landes’s  Meet Me at the River (2018).

Honours
Foster was inducted into the Musicians Hall of Fame and Museum on October 12, 2009, and was inducted into the North Carolina Music Hall of Fame on October 11, 2012.

On March 29, 2016, it was announced that Foster would become a member of the Country Music Hall of Fame. He was inducted alongside fellow North Carolinians Randy Travis and Charlie Daniels on October 16, 2016.

Death
Foster died in Nashville in 2019, aged 87, after a short illness.

References

External links
Fred Foster Interview NAMM Oral History Library (2012)

1931 births
2019 deaths
Country Music Hall of Fame inductees
People from Rutherford County, North Carolina
Record producers from North Carolina
Songwriters from North Carolina
American music industry executives